Victor Khanye Local Municipality (formerly Delmas Local Municipality) is located in the Nkangala District Municipality of Mpumalanga province, South Africa. The seat of Delmas Local Municipality is Delmas. The local municipality was one of the four to have passed the 2009-10 audit by the Auditor-General of South Africa, who deemed it to have a clean administration.

Main places
The 2001 census divided the municipality into the following main places:

Politics 

The municipal council consists of seventeen members elected by mixed-member proportional representation. Nine councillors are elected by first-past-the-post voting in nine wards, while the remaining eight are chosen from party lists so that the total number of party representatives is proportional to the number of votes received. In the election of 1 November 2021 the African National Congress (ANC) won a majority of nine seats on the council.

The following table shows the results of the election.

References

External links 
 Official homepage

Local municipalities of the Nkangala District Municipality